The Bronx is one of the five boroughs of New York City.

Bronx or The Bronx may also refer to:
 Bronx (cocktail), an alcoholic beverage
 Bronx (gargoyle), a dog-like beast from the television series Gargoyles
 Bronx, Wyoming, small community in Sublette County,
 Bronx River, the river in New York state
 Bronx, codename of WWII double agent Elvira Chaudoir
 The Bronx (band), an American punk rock band that has released five self-titled albums:
 The Bronx (2003 album) 
 The Bronx (2006 album)
 The Bronx (2008 album)
 The Bronx (2013 album)
 The Bronx (2017 album)
 The Bronx (Bogotá), an area of Bogotá